The Hamburg, is a breed of chicken which is thought to have originated in Holland (in some sources, Hamburg, Germany) sometime prior to the fourteenth century.  The name may be spelled Hamburgh in the United Kingdom and Australia.

Characteristics 

The Hamburg is a small or medium-sized breed. Eleven different colour varieties are recognised in Germany and Holland, including silver-spangled, gold-spangled, gold-pencilled, citron-pencilled, silver-pencilled, white, black and citron-spangled; six of these are included in the American standard of perfection. Pencilled breeds are smallest and self-coloured birds are largest. There are also Bantam Hamburgs.

Use 

Hamburgs mature quickly and are considered good egg producers. Eggs weigh about 50 g, with glossy, white shells.

In literature

Lalia Phipps Boone argued in 1949 that Chauntecleer and Pertelote, the chickens in Chaucer's "Nun's Priest's Tale," are Golden Spangled Hamburgs.

L. Frank Baum was keen on Hamburgs: he started a monthly trade journal, Hamburgs, in 1880; his first book, published in 1886, was The Book of the Hamburgs: A Brief Treatise upon the Mating, Rearing, and Management of the Different Varieties of Hamburgs.

References

Conservation Priority Breeds of the Livestock Conservancy
Chicken breeds
Chicken breeds originating in the Netherlands
Chicken breeds originating in Germany
Animal breeds on the RBST Watchlist
Animal breeds on the GEH Red List